Carion the Egyptian was an Egyptian Christian monk who lived during the 4th century in Scetis, Lower Egypt. He was one of the Desert Fathers.

Carion left his wife and two children to become a monk in Scetis. His son was Zacharias the Recluse (also known as Zacharias of Scetis), who was sent to Scetis to become a monk with his father during a famine.

References

4th-century births
4th-century deaths
Egyptian Christian monks
Saints from Roman Egypt
Eastern Catholic saints
Coptic Orthodox saints
Desert Fathers